County Line is an unincorporated community located on the border of Marinette and Oconto counties, in the U.S. state of Wisconsin.

Geography

The Marinette County portion of the community is located in the town of Grover, while the Oconto County portion is located in the town of Little River. East County Line Road and Old 41 Road intersect in County Line.

References

External links

Unincorporated communities in Marinette County, Wisconsin
Unincorporated communities in Oconto County, Wisconsin
Unincorporated communities in Wisconsin